Gaura is a constituency of the Uttar Pradesh Legislative Assembly covering the city of Gaura in the Gonda district of Uttar Pradesh, India.

Gaura is one of five assembly constituencies in the Gonda Lok Sabha constituency. Since 2008, this assembly constituency is numbered 301 amongst 403 constituencies and the first election was held in this constituency was in 2012 after dissolving the Saddulahnagar Assembly Constituency which had MLA Ram Pratap Singh of BJP who won again this time.

Members of Legislative Assembly

Election results

2022 
Independent Candidate Ram Pratap Singh who fought lasthana election Samajwadia Party ticket won this election 8th time in a row defeating Patel Prabhat Kumar Verma Of Bhartiya Janta Party by a margin of 22,586 votes.

2017 
Ram Pratap Singh of Samajwadit Party the current mla and bjp member joined sp and won the election by nearly 12 thousand votes

2012

The constituency is formed by dissolving old Saddulahnagr Assembly Constituency whose mla was Ram Pratap Singh Of BJP from 1991,he was the sonly of senior mla Dashrath Singh who won the constituency from 1969 to 1990 and this time again Ram Pratap Singh won this election  by a marain of 9,856 votes

References

External links
 

Assembly constituencies of Uttar Pradesh
Gonda district